The United States Virgin Islands has competed at the Pan American Games since 1967.

Medal count

References

 
Pan American Games